Port Adelaide is a single-member electoral district for the South Australian House of Assembly. Named after Port Adelaide, which it surrounds, it is a 118.8 km² suburban and industrial electorate on Adelaide's Lefevre Peninsula, and stretches east toward Adelaide's northern suburbs. It contains a mix of seaside residential areas, wasteland and industrial regions. In addition to its namesake suburb of Port Adelaide, the district  includes the suburbs of Birkenhead, Bolivar, Cavan, Dry Creek, Ethelton, Exeter, Garden Island, Gepps Cross, Gillman, Glanville, Globe Derby Park, Largs Bay, Largs North, New Port, North Haven, Osborne, Ottoway, Outer Harbor, Peterhead, Semaphore, Semaphore South, St Kilda, Taperoo, Torrens Island, Wingfield, as well as part of Rosewater.

Port Adelaide has had three incarnations as a South Australian electoral district.

Port Adelaide was the name of an electoral district of the unicameral South Australian Legislative Council from 1851 until its abolition in 1857.

From 1857 until 1902 it was a two-seat multi-member district. From 1902 until 1915 it was a large three-seat multi-member district covering Adelaide's north-west and western suburbs; together with the four-member Adelaide and five-member Torrens, the three districts with a total of 12-members covered the whole of the metropolitan area in the 42 member house.  The district returned to two members in 1915, and became a single member district from the 1938 election onward. It was held without interruption by Labor until the district's abolition prior to the 1970 election, and for most of that time was one of Labor's safest seats. The bulk of its territory was split between the neighbouring seats of Semaphore and Price.  The last member for this seat's original incarnation, John Ryan, transferred to Price.

The seat was recreated in 2002, essentially as a reconfigured version of Hart (which was itself created in 1993 as a replacement for Semaphore). Like its previous incarnation, it is a comfortably safe Labor seat.  The member for Hart, deputy premier and state treasurer Kevin Foley, followed most of his constituents into the recreated seat and held it easily.  At the 2006 election, Foley increased his margin from 21.7 percent to 25.7 percent, and gained a majority in all booths. Foley retired in 2011, triggering a by-election held in February 2012.  Susan Close retained the seat for Labor.

Members

Election results

Notes

References
 ECSA profile for Port Adelaide: 2018
 ABC profile for Port Adelaide: 2018
 Poll Bludger profile for Port Adelaide: 2018

Electoral districts of South Australia
1857 establishments in Australia
1970 disestablishments in Australia
2002 establishments in Australia